Bedburg is a town in the Rhein-Erft-Kreis, North Rhine-Westphalia of Germany with 25,000 residents. Since 2014, Sascha Solbach is the mayor of Bedburg.  The town is documented as existing as early as 893.

Climate

Notable people

Sons and daughters 
 Arnold von Harff (1471–1505), knight and adventurer
 Katharina Molitor (born 1983), spearhead

People with connection to Bedburg 

 Wilhelm von Mirbach-Harff (1871–1918), German diplomat and ambassador; lived in Bedburg and did his Abitur there
Peter Stumpp (c. 1525–1589), 16th Century serial killer known as "The Werewolf of Bedburg"

References

External links
  

Rhein-Erft-Kreis